Idukki may refer to the following places and jurisdictions in Kerala state, southern India :
 Idukki Dam, Kerala, India
 Idukki district, a district of Kerala (capital Painavu), in the Western Ghats
 Idukki township, a township in the above
 Idukki (Lok Sabha constituency), an Indian federal parliamentary constituency in Kerala
Idukki (State Assembly constituency), one of the 140 NiyamaSabha electoral colleges in Kerala
 Syro-Malabar Catholic Eparchy of Idukki (Eastern Catholic diocese, Chaldean = Syro-Oriental Rite)